Crisis: The Journal of Crisis Intervention and Suicide Prevention is a quarterly peer-reviewed academic journal covering suicidology, the study of suicide. It was established in 1980 and is published by Hogrefe Publishing under the auspices of the International Association for Suicide Prevention. The editor-in-chief is Diego De Leo (Griffith University). According to the Journal Citation Reports, the journal has a 2014 impact factor of 1.482.

References

External links

Publications established in 1980
Hogrefe Publishing academic journals
Quarterly journals
Suicidology journals
Multilingual journals